Persatuan Sepakbola Indonesia Sarmi (simply known as Persimi Sarmi or Persimi) is an Indonesian football club based in Sarmi, Sarmi Regency, Papua. They currently compete in the Liga 3.

Supporter
Persimi Mania is supporter of Persimi Sarmi.

References

Football clubs in Indonesia
Football clubs in Papua (province)
Association football clubs established in 1970
1970 establishments in Indonesia